Mary Cross (born 1934) is an American professor, editor, writer and biographer. She has written several books including biographies of figures such as Henry James and Madonna. Madonna biography was reviewed by New York Post as "fast, accurate and concise", became widely quoted and translated. Cross is professor emerita of English at Fairleigh Dickinson University, and she has taught at the City University of New York and University of Delaware. Cross has a PhD from Rutgers University and a BA from the University of Michigan. As an editor, she publisher various works, including 100 People Who Changed 20th-Century America.

Publications

References

1934 births
Living people
Celebrity biographers
20th-century American biographers
American women biographers
21st-century American biographers
21st-century American women writers
20th-century American women writers
Fairleigh Dickinson University faculty